Pope Pius are popes named Pius. It may refer to:

People

Popes of the Roman Catholic Church
 Pope Pius I (c. 140–154; officially listed as 142/146 – 157/161)
 Pope Pius II (1458–1464)
 Pope Pius III (1503)
 Pope Pius IV (1559–1565)
 Pope Pius V (1566–1572)
 Pope Pius VI (1775–1799)
 Pope Pius VII (1800–1823)
 Pope Pius VIII (1829–1830)
 Pope Pius IX (1846–1878)
 Pope Pius X (1903–1914)
 Pope Pius XI (1922–1939)
 Pope Pius XII (1939–1958)

Other people
Lucian Pulvermacher (Antipope Pius XIII; 1998–2009)

Fictional people
 Pius XV, a character in the Babylon 5 universe
 Pope Pius XIII, a character in the television series The Young Pope
 Pope Pius XIII, a character in the 1978 film Foul Play
 Pope Pius XIII, a character in the book series “Vatican Knights” by Rick Jones
 Pope Pius XVI, a character in Angels & Demons by Dan Brown

See also

 
 
 Pope Pius XIII (disambiguation)
 Pius (disambiguation)
 Pope (disambiguation)

Papal names